

East Division

West Division

Television

References

Current Canadian Football League broadcasters
Current Canadian Football League broadcasters
Current announcers